Friebe is a surname. Notable people with the surname include:

Adolf Tortilowicz von Batocki-Friebe (1868–1944), German noble, lawyer and politician
Ferdinand Friebe (1894–1980), Austrian middle-distance runner
Helmut Friebe (1894–1970), German general
Percy Friebe (born 1931), Scottish rugby union player
Werner Friebe (1897–1962), German general